PT Bukalapak.com Tbk, trading as Bukalapak, is an Indonesian e-commerce company. It was founded in 2010 as an online marketplace to facilitate online commerce for small and medium enterprises (SME). Bukalapak later expanded to digitise small family-owned businesses, known in Indonesia as warungs. The company is involved in the operations of approximately 25% of Indonesian warungs through its Mitra programme.

As of 2021, Bukalapak serves over 100 million users and seven million partners, and processes an average of over two million daily transactions. It is one of the largest e-commerce companies in Indonesia and is its fourth startup to become a unicorn. Its initial public offering (IPO) on the Indonesian Stock Exchange was the largest ever at the time, in 2021, when it raised up to US$1.5 billion, though it lost nearly 66% of its market value six months later.

History

Bukalapak was co-founded in 2010 by Achmad Zaky after he graduated from the Bandung Institute of Technology, together with his friend Nugroho Herucahyono. Bukalapak means "open a market stall" in Indonesian. Zaky's friend, Fajrin Rasyid, joined the duo to manage Bukalapak's finances. The premise of Bukalapak was simple—to digitise transactions for small businesses.

Bukalapak's early phase of development coincided with the popularity of fixie bikes, when many sellers in the community sold various types of bikes and biking accessories. Bukalapak focused on working with these sellers, which led to it being known as a marketplace for bikes at one point. It also contributed to the growth of its user base. The term "pelapak" is commonly used to describe the sellers working with Bukalapak. By 2013, the company recorded an average of IDR 500 million in daily transactions, and was working with more than 80,000 sellers.

In December 2019, Zaky announced his plan to resign, and officially resigned in January 2020, appointing Rachmat Kaimuddin as Bukalapak's new CEO. Herucahyono also resigned as CTO, later starting a venture fund for early-stage startups with Zaky. Rasjid departed in June 2020 to join Telkom Indonesia.

The departure of Bukalapak's entire co-founding team coincided with the laying off of employees. Hundreds of employees from its smart retail, internet of things, and marketing divisions were retrenched as part of a change in strategy. Kaimuddin is credited with recruiting blue chip venture capitalists and for leading the company's IPO in August 2021, which was the largest in Indonesia to date. He resigned four months later after be appointed as Technology and Sustainability Development Special Advisor Deputy at Coordinating Ministry for Maritime and Investments Affairs. Bukalapak's COO, Willix Halim took over as CEO.

Finance 
Following a shaky start, Bukalapak secured funding in June 2011 to keep its operations running, when Japanese venture capitalist Takeshi Ebihara from Batavia Incubator invested IDR 2 billion in the company. Ebihara was a mentor of the co-founders.

In February 2014, Indonesian conglomerate Emtek participated in Bukalapak's Series A round, investing for a stake that was less than 20%. Emtek's financial statements in 2015 indicated that Bukalapak received funds from Emtek totalling up to IDR 439 billion. As of July 2020, Emtek holds 35.17% of the company's shares after adjustments—the largest stake among the shareholders. Bukalapak also received investments from Aucfan, IREP, 500 Startups, and GREE Ventures. 

In January 2019, Bukalapak announced the completion of an undisclosed funding round by Mirae-Asset-Naver Asia Growth Fund, a joint venture between South Korean companies Mirae Financial Group and Naver. In November 2020, Microsoft invested US$100 million in Bukalapak as part of a deal that would see the latter adopt Microsoft Azure as its preferred cloud platform.

By June 2022, two-third of Bukalapak's revenue originated from partner companies, with the remaining third from e-commerce. That month, it also announced that losses were expected to exceed US$100 million for the fiscal year, though revenue is expected to rise by over 60%.

Leadership

Awards
 HR Awards 2022 —  Excellence in Workplace Wellbeing
 Achmad Bakrie Award XVI 2018 — Technology and Entrepreneurship
 YouTube Pulse 2018 — Best Ads – Nego Cincai
 Citra Pariwara 2017 — Bronze – Digital Viral and Email Marketing
 Tangrams Awards — E-commerce Asia Pacific
 EY Entrepreneur of the Year — Achmad Zaky – Technology and Digital Category
 PR Awards Marketing Magazine Southeast Asia 2017 — Best PR-led Integrated Communications & Best Direct-to-Consumer PR Campaign
 YouTube — The Most Popular Video in Indonesia – Pendekar Jari Sakti (Medok)
 The President of Indonesia, Joko Widodo — Satyalancana Wira Karya

See also
List of unicorn startup companies

References

Online marketplaces of Indonesia
Internet properties established in 2010
Companies based in Jakarta
Companies listed on the Indonesia Stock Exchange
Indonesian companies established in 2010
Indonesian brands
500 Startups companies
2021 initial public offerings
Elang Mahkota Teknologi